Pultenaea adunca is a species of flowering plant in the family Fabaceae and is endemic to the south of Western Australia. It is an erect, spindly shrub with hairy, needle-shaped leaves and yellow and red flowers.

Description
The flowers are yellow and red with red and yellow markings. Flowering occurs in March and October and the fruit is an oval pod.

Taxonomy and naming
Pultenaea adunca was first formally described in 1853 by Nikolai Turczaninow in the Bulletin de la Société Impériale des Naturalistes de Moscou from specimens collected by James Drummond. The specific epithet (adunca) means "bent forward or hooked", referring to the leaves.

Distribution
This pultenaea grows in the south of Western Australia between Jerramungup, Lake Grace and Esperance.

Conservation status
Pultenaea adunca is classified as "Priority Three" by the Government of Western Australia Department of Parks and Wildlife meaning that it is poorly known and known from only a few locations but is not under imminent threat.

References

adunca
Eudicots of Western Australia
Taxa named by Nikolai Turczaninow
Plants described in 1853